The city of Bellevue, Washington, part of the Seattle metropolitan area, has at least 41 high-rise buildings, 23 of which stand  or taller in height. Downtown Bellevue started to develop into a high-rise office district in the 1970s and continues to grow, with new residential buildings being added in the late 2000s. Lincoln Tower One was the first skyscraper to reach the city's  height limit upon completion in 2005.

Bellevue's history of high-rise development began with the completion of the Paccar Tower in 1970; this structure is regarded as the city's first high-rise. High-rise building construction remained slow until 1982, when the city's first building boom took place. Eight of the city's 24 tallest buildings were completed over the next seven years, including City Center Bellevue, which was the tallest building in the city for almost two decades. The high-rise construction boom ended in 1989, and only one high-rise which ranked among the city's tallest structures was completed during the 1990s. From 2000, Bellevue entered into a second, much larger building boom that continued for the next decade. More than half of Bellevue's twenty tallest buildings were completed from then on; nine projects were completed in 2008 alone, including Bellevue Towers. With the groundbreaking of the SoMa Towers project in 2012, the city entered another period of heavy building construction. In 2017, the city raised height limits to allow for buildings as tall as 600 feet (180 m) in some areas of the downtown core. As of 2021, there are eight 600-foot (180 m) skyscrapers that are either proposed, approved, or currently under construction. The East Link Extension of Link light rail is planned to open in 2023 with a station in Downtown Bellevue, incentivizing a new round of development along the eastern edge of downtown.

Overall, Bellevue's skyline is ranked third in the Northwestern United States after Seattle and Portland.



Cityscape

Tallest completed buildings
This includes spires and architectural details but does not include antenna masts. The "Year" column indicates the year in which a building was completed.

Tallest under construction, approved and proposed

Under construction
This lists buildings that are under construction in Bellevue that are expected to rise over 230 feet (70 m), but are not yet completed structures.

Approved
This lists buildings that are approved for construction that are expected to rise over 150 feet (46 m), but have not started excavation.

Proposed
This lists buildings that are proposed for construction that are expected to rise over 150 feet (46 m), but have not been approved.

* Table entries with dashes (—) indicate that information regarding building heights or dates of completion have not been released.

Timeline of tallest buildings
This is a list of buildings that once held the title of tallest building in Bellevue.

See also
List of tallest buildings in Seattle
List of tallest buildings in Tacoma, Washington

Notes
A. Based on SkyscraperPage diagrams of Seattle, Portland, and Bellevue.

References
General
 
Specific

External links
 Diagram of Bellevue skyscrapers on SkyscraperPage

Bellevue, Washington
 
Tallest in Bellevue